Chan Tah Wei (born 28 September 1969) is a Malaysian Chinese poet, prose writer and academic. He is currently teaching at the National Taiwan University.

Early life and education 
Chan was born in Ipoh, Malaysia on 28 September 1969. He received his BA in Chinese from National Taiwan University and MPhil in Chinese from Soochow University. He then obtained his PhD from National Taiwan Normal University and taught at Nanya Institute of Technology and Yuan Ze University, before returning to National Taiwan University as assistant professor.

Writings 
Chan mainly writes Modern Chinese poetries and had been receiving awards since his university years. He wrote The Prologue of Controlled Waters (Chinese:治洪前書) based on Chinese mythology, Swan Goose Gate Again (Chinese:再鴻門) which deconstructures Chinese history and The City Kingdom full of Phantoms (Chinese:盡是魅影的城國) which illustrates the daily lives of sojourned Chinese. While unlike the first three collection of poetries which focused on narratives and writing techniques, Chan wrote Approaching Ramayana (Chinese:靠近 羅摩衍那), his fourth collection of poetries, with a less intense narrative and included references to other Asian poems, such as Bei Dao and Guo Lusheng’s works and the Sanskrit epic Ramayana, differing from other modern poetries which often include Western literary or historical references and imageries.

References 

Malaysian writers
Malaysian poets
National Taiwan University alumni
Soochow University (Taiwan) alumni
National Taiwan Normal University alumni
Malaysian expatriates in Taiwan
People from Ipoh
Taiwanese poets
21st-century Taiwanese poets
1969 births
Living people